Andre Begemann and Leonardo Tavares were the defending champions, but decided not to participate this year.
Víctor Estrella and Santiago González won the final against Rainer Eitzinger and  César Ramírez 6–1, 7–6(3).

Seeds

Draw

Draw

External links
 Main Draw

Abierto Internacional Varonil Casablanca Cancun - Doubles
Mex in Mexican tennis
Abierto Internacional Varonil Casablanca Cancún